Network Inventory Advisor is a third-party network management tool for Windows OS aimed to collect all relevant data on network devices and get a detailed software and hardware statistics. The application was created by ClearApps LLC, software development company headquartered in Elk Grove, California. The first release of Network Inventory Advisor (under the name of PC Inventory Advisor) is dated March 29, 2008.

Functionality

Network Inventory Advisor allows to collect information about computers on the network, audit installed software and hardware and keep track of the related changes. The program is able to scan Windows, Linux and Mac PCs. Network Inventory Advisor has a report-building wizard for a custom report creation and a pre-defined report templates. There is a paid version and a free trail version.

Critical reception 
Network Inventory Advisor was reviewed by Windows IT Pro, Techworld, 4Sysops, Softonic, Techmixer

Release history

References

Proprietary software
Utilities for Windows